Noseworthy is an English surname. Notable people with the surname include:

Fred Noseworthy (1871–1942), Canadian track and field athlete
Jack Noseworthy (born 1969), American actor
John Noseworthy (21st century), Canadian politician
John H. Noseworthy (born 1951), American neurologist 
John Noseworthy (English politician) (c.1481–1532), English politician
Joseph W. Noseworthy (1888–1956), Canadian politician

See also
 John Noseworthy (disambiguation)
 Nosworthy

English-language surnames